This is a complete list of songs by South Korean singer Taeyeon.


Recorded songs

References

Taeyeon